General elections were held in Mauritius on 11 September 2000 to elect the members of the National Assembly.

The opposition Mauritian Militant Movement (MMM) party decisively won the elections in coalition with the Militant Socialist Movement (MSM), defeating the governing Mauritian Labour Party (MLP) led coalition. They formed together the MSM/MMM As a result, in a pre-election deal Anerood Jugnauth of the Militant Socialist Movement became Prime Minister of Mauritius before handing over to Paul Bérenger of the Mauritian Militant Movement in 2003; Bérenger would become the first non-Hindu Prime Minister of Mauritius.

Background
The Mauritian Labour Party led by Navin Ramgoolam had governed Mauritius since winning the 1995 election. A new election had to be held by December 2000 and Ramgoolam dissolved parliament to call the election on 11 August 2000. He expected to be able to win the election in a three-way contest with the Mauritian Militant Movement and Militant Socialist Movement parties splitting the opposition vote between them. However ten days after the election was called the two main opposition parties agreed a deal.

The MSM led by Anerood Jugnauth and MMM led by Paul Bérenger agreed that if they won the election Jugnauth would become Prime Minister. They agreed that after three years he would step down as Prime Minister to become the President of Mauritius with enhanced powers, and that Bérenger would become Prime Minister, the first non-Hindu to do so.

Election rules
The election was conducted under the first past the post system with three Members of parliament being elected from each of 20 mainland constituencies. A further two MPs were elected from the island of Rodrigues. Each voter was required to vote for three candidates. Once these 62 MPs were decided the Supervisory Electoral Commission chose the eight 'best losers' to prevent any ethnic community or political party from being underrepresented. The Commission chose four MPs to balance the ethnic groups (Hindus, Muslims, Chinese and general population) and another four to balance the political parties. The 'best losers' could only come from candidates who came fourth in the 20 mainland constituencies.

Campaign
There were 43 parties putting forth 535 candidates but the main contest was between the two main coalitions that campaigned on similar platforms with the economy being the dominate election issue. The governing Mauritian Labour Party promised to raise civil servants' wages and reduce the prices of drinks while the main opposition attacked corruption. Both the government and opposition parties pledged to create 70,000 jobs.

The campaign was peaceful and election day was quiet with the sale or serving of alcohol banned for two days during the election to prevent trouble. Observers from the Southern African Development Community praised the election for its efficient and fair conduct and the high turnout. The opposition Mauritian Militant Movement and Militant Socialist Movement parties won a decisive victory almost wiping out the governing party and the Prime Minister Navin Ramgoolam admitted defeat the day after the election. Gender activists were disappointed with the results which saw only four seats won by women, a decline on the previous election in 1995.

Results

Constituency winners

References

External links
Full results of the election

Elections in Mauritius
2000 in Mauritius
Mauritius